Kasam may refer to:
 Kasam (1988 film), an Indian film
 Kasam (1992 film), a Nepalese film
 Kasam (2001 film), an Indian film
 Kasamm, a 2000 Indian drama series by Ekta Kapoor for DD National
 Kasamh Se, a 2006 Indian drama series by Ekta Kapoor on Zee TV
 Kasam Tere Pyaar Ki, a 2015 Indian romance series by Ekta Kapoor on Colors TV

See also 
 
 Kassam (disambiguation)
 Qasam (disambiguation)